Simone Rasmussen (born 8 May 1993) is a Danish handball player who plays for Ringkøbing Håndbold.

References

1993 births
Living people
People from Struer Municipality
Danish female handball players
Sportspeople from the Central Denmark Region